Marie-Christine Gerhardt (born 7 April 1997) is a German rower.

She won a medal at the 2019 World Rowing Championships.

References

External links

1997 births
Living people
German female rowers
World Rowing Championships medalists for Germany